Catching the Sun may refer to:
 Catching the Sun (film), a 2015 documentary film on solar power
 Catching the Sun (album), a 1980 jazz album by jazz group Spyro Gyra